Ira Berkowitz (born October 8, 1939 in Brooklyn, New York) is an American writer of crime fiction. His Jackson Steeg Mystery Series novels are set in Hell's Kitchen.

Berkowitz's debut novel Family Matters, published in 2006, won the Washington Irving Award for Literary Merit, and was a USAToday Top Ten Summer Read selection.
He followed up with his second Washington Irving Award for his novel, Old Flame published in 2008.

The third novel in the Jackson Steeg series, Sinners' Ball published in December 2009., won the Shamus Award for Best Original Paperback Crime Fiction Novel of 2009.

Biography

Ira Berkowitz’s path to writing fiction took thirty years to complete. Growing up in Brooklyn, Berkowitz dreamed of a career in medicine or law. But advertising beckoned. When he retired, he began to write.  His first attempt at a novel garnered fifty rejections. A few were encouraging. So, he kept at it.

Berkowitz’s novels explore the themes of family, loyalty, and asymmetrical justice – an all too familiar condition where the cards are stacked against the weak.

His novels are set in Hell's Kitchen, a gentrifying neighborhood with a bloody, sordid past. It is as much a major character in the series as Jackson Steeg, an alcoholic ex-NYPD Homicide Detective. Although he mourns the changes in the neighborhood he loves, Steeg knows a simple truth: No matter how much sheen and glitz is slathered on Hell’s Kitchen, crime will always thrive in its cracks and crevasses.

Berkowitz lives with his wife in Westchester County, New York.

Novels
2006 Family Matters
2008 Old Flame
2009 Sinners’ Ball

Major characters

Jackson Steeg Ex-NYPD Homicide Detective.Graduate of Most Precious Blood parochial school.,
Dave Steeg Jackson's brother. Controls the Hell's Kitchen Rackets,
Anthony Steeg Dave's son. Attended Dartmouth,
Luce Guidry Steeg's former partner. The only person who uses his first name,
Dominic Steeg Retired NYPD Homicide Detective. Father of Jackson and Dave.,
DeeDee Santos Steeg's favorite kid,
Justin Hapner DeeDee's boyfriend,
Ginny Doyle Steeg's ex-wife,
Allie Lebow Steeg's new flame. Advertising copywriter,
Nick D'Amico Mobster. Owns Feeney's, Steeg's favorite hangout,
Zev Barak Russian mobster. Known as The Golem,
Kenny Apple Mobster. Refuses to kill on the Sabbath,
Hell's Kitchen Steeg's neighborhood,

Honors and awards
Washington Irving Award For Literary Merit – Family Matters,Old Flame,

Shamus Award. Best Original Paperback Crime Fiction Novel of 2009 – Sinners' Ball

References

External links
Ira Berkowitz

1939 births
21st-century American novelists
American crime fiction writers
American male novelists
Living people
Writers from Brooklyn
People from Westchester County, New York
Shamus Award winners
21st-century American male writers
Novelists from New York (state)